Wilmar is a city in Drew County, Arkansas, United States. The population was 511 at the 2010 census, down from 571 in 2000.

Geography
Wilmar is located in western Drew County at  (33.627572, -91.930820), along U.S. Route 278, which leads east  to Monticello, the county seat, and west  to Warren. Arkansas Highway 133 leads north from Wilmar  to Arkansas Highway 35, east of Rye.

Demographics

As of the census of 2000, there were 571 people, 238 households, and 163 families residing in the city. The racial makeup of the city was 27.50% White, 71.80% Black or African American, 0.18% Pacific Islander, and 0.53% from two or more races.

There were 238 households, out of which 31.5% had children under the age of 18 living with them, 39.5% were married couples living together, 25.2% had a female householder with no husband present, and 31.5% were non-families. 29.0% of all households were made up of individuals, and 12.6% had someone living alone who was 65 years of age or older.  The average household size was 2.40 and the average family size was 2.93.

In the city, the population was spread out, with 27.1% under the age of 18, 9.1% from 18 to 24, 25.4% from 25 to 44, 21.7% from 45 to 64, and 16.6% who were 65 years of age or older.  The median age was 37 years. For every 100 females, there were 89.7 males.  For every 100 females age 18 and over, there were 80.1 males.

The median income for a household in the city was $16,304, and the median income for a family was $23,854. Males had a median income of $19,643 versus $16,071 for females. The per capita income for the city was $10,810.  About 24.8% of families and 29.5% of the population were below the poverty line, including 39.4% of those under age 18 and 40.6% of those age 65 or over.

Education
Wilmar is served by the Drew Central School District.

On July 1, 1990 the Wilmar School District was consolidated into the Drew Central School District. Drew Central operated schools in Wilmar from 1990 until 1992, when they were consolidated with those on the main Drew Central campus.

References

Cities in Drew County, Arkansas
Cities in Arkansas